The Men's 1 km time trial was held on 21 October 2017.

Results

Qualifying
The top 8 riders qualified for the final.

Finals

References

Men's 1 km time trial
European Track Championships – Men's 1 km time trial